The women's competition in the middleweight  (– 63 kg) division was staged on November 25, 2009.

Schedule

Medalists

Records

Results

References
Results 

- Women's 63 kg, 2009 World Weightlifting Championships
World